Notopogon armatus is a species of fish in the family Centriscidae. This species is endemic to the central Indian Ocean, near the Ile Amsterdam and Ile St. Paul.

References

Further reading

WoRMS

armatus
Marine fish
Taxa named by Henri Émile Sauvage
Fish described in 1879